

Medal summary

Men

Women

Medal table

External links
  2011 Southeast Asian Games

2011 Southeast Asian Games events
Boxing at the Southeast Asian Games
2011 in boxing